"If I Ever" is a song by the British-American synthpop duo Red Flag. It was released as a single in 1989. The song charted highly on the US Billboard Hot Dance Club Play chart, peaking at #12.

Track listings
12" maxi-single
Catalog#: 7 75527-0
A1. "If I Ever" (12" Dance Mix) (6:51)
A2. "If I Ever" (LP Version) (3:44)
B1. "If I Ever" (Instrumental) (4:44)
B2. "If I Ever" (Dub Mix) (6:39)

Cassette maxi-single
Catalog#: 7 75043-4
 "If I Ever" (LP Version)
 "If I Ever" (Dance Mix)

CD promo-single
Catalog#: EPRO-199
 "If I Ever" (Hot Radio Mix) (3:51)
 "If I Ever" (12" Dance Remix) (6:51)
 "If I Ever" (LP Version) (3:44)

Chart position

References

1989 songs
1989 singles
Red Flag (band) songs
Enigma Records singles